The enzyme 3-deoxy-D-manno-octulosonate aldolase catalyzes the chemical reaction

3-deoxy-D-manno-octulosonate  pyruvate + D-arabinose

This enzyme belongs to the family of lyases, specifically the aldehyde-lyases, which cleave carbon-carbon bonds.  The systematic name of this enzyme class is 3-deoxy-D-manno-octulosonate D-arabinose-lyase (pyruvate-forming). Other names in common use include 2-keto-3-deoxyoctonate aldolase, KDOaldolase, 3-deoxyoctulosonic aldolase, 2-keto-3-deoxyoctonic aldolase, 3-deoxy-D-manno-octulosonic aldolase, and 3-deoxy-D-manno-octulosonate D-arabinose-lyase.

References

 

EC 4.1.2
Enzymes of unknown structure